Henri Fréteur (born 19 February 1877, date of death unknown) was a French gymnast. He competed in the men's individual all-around event at the 1900 Summer Olympics.

References

External links

1877 births
Year of death missing
French male artistic gymnasts
Olympic gymnasts of France
Gymnasts at the 1900 Summer Olympics
People from Croix, Nord
Sportspeople from Nord (French department)
Place of death missing